Will Hubbell is an American author and illustrator. He began as an author and illustrator of children's picture books. Subsequently, he authored science fiction. More recently, he has authored fantasy novels under the pen name of Morgan Howell.

Works
 Children's books
 Pumpkin Jack (2000) (Whitman, Albert & Company )
 Apples Here! (2002) (Whitman, Albert & Company )
 Snow Day Dance (2005) (Whitman, Albert & Company )
 Science fiction
 Cretaceous Sea (2002) (Ace Publishers)
 Sea of Time (2004) (Ace Publishers)
 Fantasy (under the pen name, Morgan Howell)
 Queen of the Orcs, Trilogy
 King's Property (2007) (Del Rey)
 Clan Daughter (2007) (Del Rey)
 Royal Destiny (2007) (Del Rey)
 The Shadowed Path, Trilogy
 A Woman Worth Ten Coppers (2008) (Del Rey)
 Candle in the Storm (2009) (Del Rey)
 The Iron Palace (2010) (Del Rey)

References

External links 
 Official website
 Profile
 Events History

Living people
21st-century American novelists
American children's writers
American fantasy writers
American illustrators
American male novelists
American science fiction writers
21st-century American male writers
Year of birth missing (living people)